The Matlatzincan languages are a pair of closely related branches of the Oto-Manguean language family in the Oto-Pamean group, spoken in Central Mexico: Tlahuica/Ocuiltec in one and Matlatzinca-Pirinda in the other. They were variously understood as a single macrolanguage or as two distinct languages, and today most linguists and speakers consider them to be separate. Both Matlatzinca and Tlahuica are moribund, and Pirinda went fully extinct in 1936. 

In 2003, together with 62 other languages, Matlatzinca was recognised as an official language of Mexico as an official language on equal footing with Spanish.

See also
Matlatzinca people
Languages of Mexico
Oto-Manguean languages

Notes

Indigenous languages of Mexico
Mesoamerican languages
Oto-Pamean languages
Endangered Oto-Manguean languages
Matlatzinca
Temascaltepec